Shofur LLC is a transportation logistics  and charter bus booking platform  headquartered in Atlanta, GA that offers bus service in 250+ cities worldwide. The company uses proprietary software with access to real-time availability data to match customers with bus operators. There are currently over 1,000 active bus operators registered on the platform.

Customers can reserve a bus either through the company's website or by phone. Shofur also provides transportation for major events and conventions that require advanced logistics and planning. The company has provided large-scale motor coach service to universities, government agencies, large corporations, sporting events and music festivals.

History

Shofur was founded in 2012 by Armir Harris with $800 and while working at his uncle's livery company. When the Democratic National Convention arrived in Charlotte and requested charter bus service for the entire event, Harris aggregated 60+ vehicles from various companies across the southeast. After the convention's success, Harris developed an online platform to streamline the reservation process and connect customers with bus operators. As of 2017, over 1,000 bus companies have joined the platform which services over 250 cities worldwide.

The company has experienced rapid growth due to a technology-first approach that has set it apart from other companies. Many tech publications have written about the technology including Engadget and Skift.

In August 2017, Shofur was ranked the 21 fastest growing company in the US by Inc. Magazine.

Products and Services

Bus Reservations

Shofur's primary business line is bus reservations made through their online platform. The company serves client across a variety of industries and works with Fortune 500s, the DOD (Department of Defense), global DMCs (Destination Management Companies), and major airlines. Reservations can be made 24/7 directly on shofur.com or over the phone through a booking agent.

The company gained publicity in 2017 when it assisted the FEMA in emergency evacuation efforts during Hurricane Matthew. Shofur evacuated an estimated 10,000 Floridians and Georgians to areas such as Atlanta, Florida's west coast, and the pan handle. Shofur has also assisted in past emergency transportation that included the transportation of NY workers during power outages in 2014 and the Louisiana floods.

Event Transportation
In addition to individual bookings, Shofur offers event transportation and logistics services. The company has helped transport large groups for major events including trade conventions, political rallies, sporting events, and corporate shuttles. In 2017, Shofur organized over 500 buses for the Woman's March on Washington  one of the largest events in the company's history.

The company's scale and utilization tracking software allows it to delivery transportation for nearly any size event cost-effectively. Shofur also offers a system for event organizers to plan and track their vehicles in real-time. Drivers are equipped with the Shofur App that tracks their precise location, provide scheduling updates, and check-in individual passengers. Event organizers can then log into shofur.com and track everything in real-time through a custom dashboard.

Shofur Market
In 2014, the company launched Shofur Market, an online marketplace for the buying and selling of commercial passenger vehicles. The platform allows bus and limo companies and manufacturers to post vehicles.

Mobile App

The Shofur mobile app for iPhone  and Android  was originally released in 2016. The app allows customers to rent charter buses and is used by event organizers to track vehicles in real-time and ticket customers. The app features GPS tracking technology allowing each individual driver using the app to be monitored and logged. It is the only mobile app that allows for on-demand charter bus and mini bus reservations.

Bus Tickets
In June 2016, Shofur launched an aggregation-based website to sell individual bus tickets for inter-city bus travel. The service first launched in the Texas Triangle serving Austin, Houston, Dallas, San Antonio, and Waco. The website aggregates ticket prices and schedules of various bus services across the US and Canada. Customers can compare pricing and times from leading bus lines and checkout through shofur.com or the Shofur App  for iPhone and Android.

Shofur Buses
Shofur began offering a premium line of buses selected from its network of operators. Many of these buses offer high end amenities including power outlets, Wi-Fi, reclining seats, and restrooms. They are wrapped in black with the Shofur logo in green lettering on each side. Some vehicles also feature a custom leather interior with Shofur branding on the seats.

Shofur Podcast
In 2017 Shofur launched a monthly podcast  that features interviews with leaders in technology, venture capital, and the Atlanta startup scene. It has gained a significant following in Atlanta and amongst investors in the transportation technology space. Notable guests include investors from O'Reilly AlphaTech Ventures (OATV) and other thought leaders based in Atlanta.

Philanthropy
The company has notably been cited for filling a bus with over 1,000 toys for kids. The company aimed to donate $100 per bus to Toys for Tots when customers booked the company's services and mentioned #T4TChallenge.

In 2016, Shofur pledged to donate $150 to a women's charity for every bus reserved for transportation to the Women's March on Washington. As of December 7, 2016, the company has reserved nearly 2,000 buses for the event. Many well-known organizations have chosen Shofur as their official supplier of transportation for the event. Armir Harris, CEO and Founder of Shofur, was quoted as stating "As a political refugee who was raised by a single mother, this cause stands dear to my heart. I look forward to the opportunity to help many of you form your travel plans to get to Washington. I want you to know that I stand behind you and am proud to help you make history.”

References

External links 
 Shofur Twitter
 Shofur Company Website

Companies based in Atlanta
Privately held companies of the United States
Transportation companies of the United States
Intercity bus companies of the United States
Transportation companies based in Georgia (U.S. state)